The 2014–15 Harrisburg Heat season was the third season of the Harrisburg Heat professional indoor soccer club. The Heat, an Eastern Division team in the Major Arena Soccer League, played their home games at the Pennsylvania Farm Show Complex & Expo Center's Large Arena in Harrisburg, Pennsylvania.

The team was led by owner John Wilsbach, head coach Tarik Walker, and assistant coach Gino DiFlorio. The Heat struggled this season, earning a 2–18 record and last place in the five-team Eastern Division. All of the Heat's home games aired live on WMSS (91.1 FM). Most MASL games were streamed by Go Live Sports with select games streamed live by ESPN3.

Season summary 
The Heat celebrated last season's relative success at the box office by moving to the Farm Show's Large Arena and there they performed well this season, drawing an average of 2,989 fans to each home game, nearly double last season's average. However, on the field the team found little to celebrate. The Heat lost their first 12 games in a row before defeating the St. Louis Ambush 25–16 in front of a home crowd on January 30. The Heat then lost their next 6 games before a season-finale win over the Detroit Waza on February 28. This gave Harrisburg a 2–18 record and fifth-place in the five-team Eastern Division.

History
The new Heat claim the heritage of the original Harrisburg Heat professional indoor soccer team which played 12 seasons in the National Professional Soccer League, which later became the second Major Indoor Soccer League, from 1991 through 2003.

The Heat completed their inaugural 2012-13 season with a 6–10 record, finishing 3rd in the PASL's Eastern Division. In the 2013–14 season, they slipped to 4–12 and did not qualify for the playoffs. After playing at the 2,200-seat Equine Arena for their first two seasons, the Heat moved to the Farm Show Complex's 7,300-seat Large Arena for 2014–15.

Off-field moves
In May 2014, the Professional Arena Soccer League added six teams from the failed third incarnation of the Major Indoor Soccer League and reorganized as the Major Arena Soccer League. The 2014–15 MASL season will be 20 games long, 4 more than the 16 regular season games of recent PASL seasons. With the league expansion and reorganization, the Heat's Eastern division rivals for 2014–15 are the Baltimore Blast, Detroit Waza, Rochester Lancers, and Syracuse Silver Knights.

Four of the five Eastern Division teams (the three former MISL clubs plus Harrisburg) will keep score with multi-point scoring at their home games. Most goals will be worth two points but goals scored from outside a 45-foot arc on the turf will be worth three points. Games played at Detroit or in the Central, Southern, and Pacific Divisions will be scored with traditional soccer scoring where each goal is worth one point.

On June 18, the team introduced original Harrisburg Heat star Tarik Walker as the head coach for the 2014–15 season. Walker replaces Richard Chinapoo who led the team for its first two seasons.

Roster moves
In August 2014, the team re-signed forward Chris Hall and midfielder Tyler Witmer. The Heat held an open tryout camp on September 6–7 to find new players and evaluate returning veterans. After the tryout camp, the team signed forwards Dean Miller and Tom Mellor plus midfielder Kenny Fultz. On September 20, the Heat held an invitation-only tryout camp to further evaluate veterans hoping to return and select new players.

The team opened training camp on October 7. On October 20, the team announced the signings of veteran goalkeepers Justin Johnson and Tim Mehl plus defenders Brad Kerstetter and Zach Sell. On October 21, the Heat re-signed midfielder Kevin Wolfe plus defenders Val Teixeira, Connor Malone, and Craig Tyrrell. On October 22, defender Chris Bock, forward Georges NouBossie and Patrick Crawford, plus midfielders David Cash and Patrick Thompson were added to the roster.

Schedule

Pre-season

Regular season

♣ Game played with traditional soccer scoring (all goals worth 1 point).

Personnel

Player roster
As of November 18, 2014

Staff
The team is owned and operated by broadcaster John Wilsbach. Patty Butala is the ticket manager. Seth Stover is in charge of group ticket sales. Toan Ngo is the team's web designer. The coaching staff includes head coach Tarik Walker, assistant coach Gino DiFlorio, trainer Amanda Kuchinski, and equipment manager Mike Butala.

References

External links
Harrisburg Heat official website
Harrisburg Heat at The Patriot-News

Harrisburg Heat (MASL)
Harrisburg Heat
Harrisburg Heat 2014
Harrisburg Heat 2014
Harrisburg Heat 2014